Jo Sondre Aas (born 2 July 1989) is a Norwegian football player currently playing as a striker for Levanger.

Career
After impressing performances for Rosenborg's youth-team in a tournament in Spain, Real Madrid invited Aas for a trial where he impressed, netting a hat-trick for Real's C team. However, he declined a contract and chose to stay in Norway. He started the 2009 season on loan from Rosenborg to Moss FK, but the contract was terminated after 19 matches, and Aas went on loan to Ranheim for the rest of the 2009 season. He was on loan to Ranheim until he permanently changed to Ranheim before the season 2011. He signed a three year contract with Sandefjord on 11 January 2012 but after only one season with Sandefjord he returned to Ranheim because of personal reasons. 

On 13 December 2018, Aas signed with Nest-Sotra.

Career statistics

Honours
Individual
 Adeccoligaen top scorer: 2013

References

1989 births
Living people
Norwegian footballers
Rosenborg BK players
Moss FK players
Eliteserien players
People from Rennebu
Ranheim Fotball players
Sandefjord Fotball players
Nest-Sotra Fotball players
Norwegian First Division players
Association football forwards
Sportspeople from Trøndelag